Jane Clarke may refer to:

 Jane Clarke (scientist) (born 1950), professor of molecular biophysics at the University of Cambridge
 Jane E. Clarke (born 1954), children's author
 Jane Clarke (media industry)
 Jane Clarke (poet), from Co. Roscommon, Republic of Ireland

See also
 Mary Jane Clarke (1862–1910), suffragette